Cortlandt Van Rensselaer (26 May 1808, in Albany, New York – 25 July 1860, in Burlington, New Jersey) was a Presbyterian clergyman from the United States.

Early life
He was a son of General Stephen Van Rensselaer and Cornelia Bell Paterson, his father's second wife.  He graduated from Yale in 1827, and then studied at Union Theological Seminary, Prince Edward County, Virginia, (now Union Presbyterian Seminary) and at Princeton Theological Seminary.

Career
He was a missionary to the slaves in Virginia 1833–1835. He was ordained in 1835, and became pastor of the Presbyterian church in Burlington, New Jersey, in 1837, of the 2nd Presbyterian Church, Washington, D.C., in 1841, and agent of Princeton Theological Seminary in 1844, raising $100,000 for its endowment. He was secretary of the Presbyterian board of education 1846–1860, and founded and edited the Presbyterian Magazine and The Home, the School, and the Church.

The New York University gave him the degree of D.D. in 1845. Much of his large fortune was devoted to benevolent objects and to the religious enterprises of the Presbyterian church. After his death, selections from his published writings appeared under the title of Miscellaneous Sermons, Essays, and Addresses, edited by his son, Cortlandt Van Rensselaer (Philadelphia, 1861).

Personal life
He was married to Catherine Ledyard (1811–1882), sister of Henry Ledyard. Together Cortlandt and Catherine had:

 Cortlandt Van Rensselaer (1838–1864), a captain in the U.S. Army, who died in Nashville, Tennessee with the 13th United States Infantry, aged 27.
 Philip Ledyard Van Rensselaer (1839–1873), who died at Vevey, Switzerland, aged 34.
 Ledyard Van Rensselaer (1843–1892), who died unmarried
 Alice Cogswell Van Rensselaer (1846–1878), who married Edward Blanchard Hodge (1841–1906) in 1868.
 Elizabeth Wadsworth Van Rensselaer (1848–1886)
 Alexander Van Rensselaer (1850–1933), who married Sarah Rozet Drexel Fell (1860–1929), daughter of Anthony Joseph Drexel (1826–1893)

Van Rensselaer died on July 25, 1860, in Burlington, New Jersey.

References

References

1808 births
1860 deaths
Presbyterian Church in the United States of America ministers
Yale University alumni
Schuyler family
Cortlandt
American people of Dutch descent